Port Perry/Utica Field Aerodrome  is an airport located  west southwest of Port Perry, Ontario, Canada.

References

Registered aerodromes in Ontario